Surrey/King George Airpark  was located  southwest of Surrey, British Columbia, Canada.

NAV Canada announced in a NOTAM (Notice to Airmen) on September 30, 2020, that this airpark is permanently closed.

See also
 List of airports in the Lower Mainland

References

Registered aerodromes in British Columbia
Airports in Greater Vancouver
Transport in Surrey, British Columbia